Hisarak or Hesarak (Pashto: حصارك), is the center of Hesarak District, Afghanistan.

See also 
Nangarhar Province
Rasool jabarkhiel

References

Populated places in Nangarhar Province